Nedyalko Yordanov (born 18 January 1940) is a Bulgarian poet, playwright, and publicist. He graduated from high school in his hometown Burgas on the Black Sea coast. In 1962 he graduated with a degree in Bulgarian philology from the St. Clement of Ohrid Sofia University. Between 1962 and 1963 he worked as a teacher in Malko Tarnovo.

Later, from 1963 to 1983 he was a playwright in the Burgas drama theatre. For the period 1980-1988 he was the main editor of the almanac Sea. During 1990 he became a playwright for the theatre Vazrazhdane in Sofia.

He began publishing in 1954 in the newspaper Black Sea Front, Burgas. He is actively cooperating with the daily press. He translates poetry from Russian and Turkish. His works are translated into Russian, Polish, German and many other languages.

References

1940 births
Living people
Writers from Burgas
Bulgarian male writers
Bulgarian male poets
Bulgarian memoirists
Bulgarian writers
Bulgarian poets